Smoothie King Franchises Inc. (doing business as Smoothie King) is an American privately held smoothie company.  Founded in 1973, the company was bought by a South Korean franchisee in 2012.  In the late 2010s, the company was focusing on whole and unmodified ingredients.

Products
, the company was focusing on its "Clean Blends initiative" whereby stores' menus featured more smoothies with whole fruits and vegetables, and lacking food coloring, artificial flavor, preservatives, and added sugar.

Corporate history
Smoothie King was founded in 1973 in Kenner, Louisiana by Steve and Cindy Kuhnau.  , Smoothie King was still a privately held company.

In 2012, Wan Kim—a South Korean Smoothie King franchisee since 2002—bought the company from the Kuhnaus.  Kim then acquired  (equivalent to about $M in ) from Standard Charter Private Equity and National Pension Fund to grow the company.  To succeed in this growth, Kim had several plans for Smoothie King.  Kim planned to open 800 new franchises and the company's first 200 corporately-owned stores.  He also planned to experiment with selling salads and wraps at these latter locations (in South Korea, they made over 20% of Kim's revenue).

In early 2014, Smoothie King contracted with the New Orleans Pelicans to rename the New Orleans Arena, Smoothie King Center.  The contract was for 2014–2024, and Smoothie King has the option to extend the contract through 2034.  The National Basketball Association required that all Smoothie King products be tested before the deal was completed, to ensure that they didn't contain any league-banned substances; testing was an eight-month process.

Personnel
CEO since 2012, Wan Kim had Tom O'Keefe as Smoothie King's corporate president in 2014, and in February 2019 he replaced Jennifer Herskind with Rebecca Miller (previously of On the Border Mexican Grill & Cantina) as chief marketing officer.  Kim further shuffled his corporate positions in September 2019: chief operating officer Dan Harmon added president to his plate (replacing O'Keefe), chief development officer Kevin King became the chief business development officer, and Miller was promoted to head of field marketing.

Locations

By 2012, Smoothie King was headquartered in Covington, Louisiana. , Smoothie King was based in Coppell, Texas.

Predominantly in the United States, Smoothie King also has locations in South Korea, the Cayman Islands, Trinidad and Tobago, and previously had shops in Singapore (which opened in December 2012, but permanently closed in 2016).  CEO Wan Kim has explicitly detailed the company's avoidance of cold-weather location due to other smoothie companies' failures there.  In 2018, the company opened its 1001st store.

References

1973 establishments in Louisiana
2012 mergers and acquisitions
companies based in Dallas
fast-food chains of the United States
fast-food franchises
restaurants established in 1973
restaurants in Louisiana
smoothie chains in the United States